Grupo Aeroportuario del Pacífico, S.A.B. de C.V. ("Pacific Airports Group, LLC"), known as GAP, is a Mexican airport operator headquartered in Guadalajara, Mexico. It operates 12 airports in the western states of Mexico, and 2 in Jamaica, including those of major Mexican cities Guadalajara and Tijuana, and two important tourist destinations, Los Cabos and Puerto Vallarta. It is the second largest airport services company by passenger traffic in Mexico. It serves approximately 27 million passengers annually, only surpassed by the operator of Mexico City International Airport.

Since 2011 there is an ongoing dispute between GAP and one of its major shareholders, Grupo México, which holds more than 20% of the shares and announced it planned to acquire at least 30% of the shares. According to GAP by-laws, its shareholders should not hold more than 10% of the shares. In 2015, Grupo México announced it has reduced its stake in GAP, although not enough to meet GAP by-laws rules.

GAP is listed on the Mexican Stock Exchange and in the NYSE through ADRs since 2006. It is a constituent of the IPC, the main benchmark index of the Mexican Stock Exchange.

Operating Airports

Airports outside México

History, objectives and policies
Grupo Aeroportuario del Pacífico (GAP) was founded in 1998, when the Mexican airport system was opened to private investment. Since that time, GAP has administered, operated, maintained and developed twelve airports in the Pacific and Central regions of Mexico.

Objectives
GAP derives income from passenger traffic and through marketing of its commercial spaces. In the commercial arena, the business strategy is focused on increasing the profit opportunities in retail spaces. To meet this strategy, the Group has placed in operation and continue to develop modern and attractive commercial areas. The objectives of Grupo Aeroportuario del Pacífico have been stated as: to fund the appropriate levels of infrastructure at their airports; to provide the technology, management methods, and modern operational tools to elevate levels of efficiency and operation; to meet international efficiency standards; and, finally, to maintain the present levels of security. The activities of the Group are held to a criterion of economic rationality, so that investors receive an attractive rate of return.

GAP has developed a comprehensive plan of airport development that is described in the Development Master Plan 2010–2014. To meet the objective to adapt the infrastructures of their airports, GAP foresees investing approximately 2,770 million pesos in the period 2010–2014.

In February 2006, shares of GAP were enlisted in the NYSE under "PAC", and in the Bolsa Mexicana de Valores under "GAP".

GAP environmental policy
Grupo Aeroportuario del Pacífico undertakes actions that have as a main objective to serve with high quality levels, safety and comfort in close harmony with the environment.

Furthermore, GAP Environmental commitment has been developed in a constant manner, through defined programs and actions, providing resources to guarantee environmental normative fulfillment.

GAP's objective is to reduce as much as possible Environmental Impacts that are potentially associated with airport activity and infrastructure development, this will be done by defining the measures for its prevention, protection, improvement and correction in its case, guaranteeing the best quality levels and environmental normative fulfillment. As a consequence of this policy, GAP has obtained the Environmental Certificate granted by Federal Office for Environ Protection, and will ensure its maintenance by establishing a system for environmental management evaluation.

Statistics
The company operates the third, fifth and sixth most important airports in Mexico, being the Guadalajara, Tijuana and Los Cabos International Airports respectively. However, many of the airports operated by GAP have recently suffered negative percentage variations in terms of passengers traffic. This is due to the decrease of routes and frequencies by many airlines. For example, it is important to comment on the significant reduction of Aviacsa's operations at many of the company's airports during the month of April as well as year-to-date 2008. GAP expects further decreases in operations from this airline during this year, including the cancellation of operations at several of their airports, however these routes are not exclusive, therefore they expect that some of the flights will be gradually absorbed by other airlines in the market.

Also, at the close of April 2008, the weekly schedule of flights operated by Low Cost Carriers decreased by 73 weekly segments compared to March 2008, for a total of 971 frequencies and a total of 63 routes operated by these types of carriers. The decline in frequencies was mainly due to a restructuring of routes and frequencies by the airlines, with the objective of increasing profitability as a result of the highly competitive environment and the increasing cost of jet fuel.

Passenger numbers

Airports in Mexico
Number of passengers at each airport by 2021:

Airports outside Mexico
Number of passengers at each airport by 2021:

References

External links

 Official Website

Companies listed on the New York Stock Exchange
Airport operators of Mexico
Airports in Mexico
Aviation in Mexico
Companies listed on the Mexican Stock Exchange
Companies based in Guadalajara, Jalisco
Mexican companies established in 1998